Helsinki Pride is an LGBT pride event in Helsinki, Finland. The event takes place during the last week of June.

The event lasts all week and is usually held the week after midsummer. On Monday, the program opens, and during the week there are usually sporting events, gathering of young people in the evening, and a rainbow fair. In addition, a number celebrate the role of women. The week culminates in Saturday's Pride parade, which runs through the center of Helsinki. The procession ends in the park where celebrations continue. In the park there is generally a celebratory program of music and speeches. Saturday night also sees entertainment in the city's gay nightclubs.

In 2018 attendance figures nearly tripled from 2017 numbers to record-breaking 100,000 people making it one of the biggest public events ever in Finland.

History
Helsinki Pride continues the tradition established by Seta's "Freedom Day" in 1975. Previously, the Pride was held in Helsinki in even years (2004, 2006 etc.) and in odd years (2003, 2005, etc.) in one of the other major cities in Finland. Since 2006, the LGBT pride has been held in Helsinki every year. Also other major Finnish cities have organized prides of their own, including Tampere Pride, North Pride in Oulu and Lahti Pride.

In 2010 the parade was disrupted on the corner of Aleksanterinkatu and Kluuvikatu by a tear gas attack, in which several people, the youngest less than 1 year old, were injured. Police later arrested three men.

External links

References

Culture in Helsinki
LGBT events in Finland
Pride parades in Europe
Parades in Finland
Summer events in Finland